Claire Fuller (born 9 February 1967 in Oxfordshire) is an English author. She won the 2015 Desmond Elliott Prize for her first novel, Our Endless Numbered Days, the BBC Opening Lines Short Story Competition in 2014, and the Royal Academy & Pin Drop Short Story Award in 2016. Her second novel, Swimming Lessons, was shortlisted for the 2018 Royal Society of Literature Encore Award. Bitter Orange, her third, was nominated for the International Dublin Literary Award. Her most recent novel, Unsettled Ground, won the Costa Book Awards Novel Award 2021  and was shortlisted for the 2021 Women's Prize for Fiction

Life and career
Fuller, born and raised in Oxfordshire, studied sculpture at Winchester School of Art in the 1980s, working mainly in wood and stone, before embarking on a marketing career. She began writing fiction at the age of 40 and holds a master's degree in creative and critical writing from the University of Winchester. Of the process, she told a fellow writer, "Getting the words down is torture. Once they're written, I love rewriting, editing and polishing."

Our Endless Numbered Days, the first of her five novels, was published in the UK by Penguin Books, and in the United States (Tin House) and Canada (House of Anansi Press). It appeared in translation in a further 12 countries. Swimming Lessons was published by Penguin(UK) in 2017, and was also published in the United States, Canada and a further 6 countries. Bitter Orange, was published in 2018 by Penguin(UK) and in the United States and Canada, and was/will be published in a further 6 countries. Unsettled Ground was published in 2021 in the UK, the US and Canada, and was/will be published in a further 14 countries.

Stories and essays of hers have appeared in England's Sunday Express, Litro, HuffPost, and The Telegraph.

She is married, with two adult children.

Novels
Our Endless Numbered Days (2015) won the 2015 Desmond Elliott Prize for debut fiction and was long-listed for the International Dublin Literary Award. It was also nominated for the 2015 Edinburgh First Book Award, long-listed for the 2016 Waverton Good Read Award, and a finalist in the American Booksellers Association's 2016 Indies Best Books Award. It was a Richard & Judy Book Club pick for Spring 2016 and a Waterstones Book Club book. In 2015 it was selected by Powells as an indispensable book. It tells the story of Peggy Hillcoat, who when she is eight in 1976, spends her summer camping with her father, playing her beloved record of The Railway Children and listening to her mother's grand piano. After a family crisis which Peggy fully understands only later, her survivalist father James takes her from London to a cabin in a remote European forest. There he tells Peggy the rest of the world has disappeared – her life is reduced to a piano which makes music but no sound, a forest where all that grows is a means of survival and a tiny wooden hut that is Everything. Peggy is not seen again for another nine years.
Swimming Lessons (2017) tells the story of Ingrid Coleman who writes letters to her husband, Gil, about the truth of their marriage, but decides not to send them. Instead she hides them within the thousands of books her husband collects. After she writes her final letter, Ingrid disappears from an English beach. Twelve years later, her adult daughter, Flora, comes home after Gil says he has spotted Ingrid through a bookshop window. Flora, who has existed in a limbo of hope, grief, imagination and fact, wants answers, but fails to realise that what she is looking for is hidden in the books that surround her.
Bitter Orange (2018): Frances Jellico is dying and remembers the summer of 1969, when she was commissioned to survey the follies in the garden of Lyntons – a decrepit and almost derelict country house. Living there in the attic for a month or so, she meets Cara and Peter who are staying in the rooms below hers. As Frances falls under her new friends' spell and she learns their stories, the house offers up its secrets, until her life is changed forever.
Unsettled Ground (2021) was shortlisted for the 2021 Women's Prize for Fiction and won the Costa Book Award for Best Novel. Twins Jeanie and Julius have always known they differ from others. At 51 years old, they still live with their mother Dot in isolation in the English countryside. The cottage they have rented for their whole lives is both their armour and their provider. Inside its walls they make music, in its garden grow (and sometimes kill) all they need to survive. To an outsider it looks like poverty, but to them it is home. When Dot dies unexpectedly, the twins are exposed to a truth with far-reaching repercussions. As members of the local community start to make things difficult for the twins, Jeanie wonders how they will cope in a world which can be cruel and unyielding. The book portrays rural poverty in the 21st century, forcing readers to see beyond the unsavoury, the unconventional, the "other", and recognise what unites us all: the beating heart beneath. The story is of resilience and hope, homelessness and hardship, love and survival, centred on two marginalized but remarkable people.

Bibliography
Our Endless Numbered Days, Tin House Books, 2015, 
Swimming Lessons, Tin House Books, 2017, 
Bitter Orange, Tin House Books, 2018, 
Unsettled Ground, Tin House Books, 2021, 
The Memory of Animals, Tin House Books (North America) & Penguin Books (elsewhere), 2023,

References

External links
Author homepage
Author Twitter account
Author Instagram account

English women novelists
Alumni of the University of Winchester
Living people
1967 births
People from Oxfordshire (before 1974)
21st-century English novelists
21st-century English women writers